Profiles in Terror: A Guide to Middle East Terrorist Organizations is a 2004 book by Aaron Mannes.  It profiles more than twenty terrorist organizations operating in the Middle East and their affiliate groups worldwide, describing their characteristics: ideology and objectives; history; leadership; organization; external relations; financial support networks; target and tactics; external relations; a chronology of significant events and attacks; and references for each group.

The book was published by Rowman & Littlefield in 2004 as a 392-page hardcover. It was published in cooperation with JINSA Press (an imprint of the Jewish Institute for National Security Affairs) as a JINSA book.

External links
Profiles in Terror at the publisher's website.

2004 non-fiction books
Books about Islamism
Books about terrorism